Absence of War Does Not Mean Peace is the seventh full-length release by Finnish black metal band Impaled Nazarene. The release was recorded at Anssi Kippo's Astia Studio from July to August 2001.

A music video was made for "Hardboiled and Still Hellbound", featuring former Finnish porn star Rakel Liekki.

Track listing
All Songs Written By Impaled Nazarene, except where noted.
 Stratagem 1:12
 Absence of War 2:27
 The Lost Art of Goat Sacrificing 3:54
 Prequel to Bleeding (Angels III) 2:48
 Hardboiled and Still Hellbound 2:31
 Into the Eye of the Storm 4:44
 Before the Fallout 1:05 (Written By Trollhorn)
 Humble Fuck of Death 2:53
 Via Dolorosa 4:08
 Nyrkillä Tapettava Huora 3:00
 Never Forgive 3:58
 Satan Wants You Dead 0:16
 The Madness Behind 4:12

Personnel
Mika Luttinen – vocals
Teemu Raimoranta – guitar
Onraj 9 mm – guitar
Arc v 666 – bass
Repe Misanthrope – drums, synthesizer
With Anssi Kippo: Lead Guitar on tracks 5 & 10

Production
Arranged By Impaled Nazarene
Produced By Impaled Nazarene & Anssi Kippo
Recorded & Engineered By Anssi Kippo; Assistant Engineer: Sauli Impola
Mixed By Mikko Karmila
Mastered By Mika Jussila

2001 albums
Impaled Nazarene albums
Osmose Productions albums